Astroblepus formosus is a species of catfish of the family Astroblepidae. It occurs only on a short stretch of the Ucayali River in Peru.

References

Bibliography
Eschmeyer, William N., ed. 1998. Catalog of Fishes. Special Publication of the Center for Biodiversity Research and Information, num. 1, vol. 1–3. California Academy of Sciences. San Francisco, California, United States. 2905. .

Astroblepus
Endemic fauna of Peru
Freshwater fish of Peru
Fish described in 1945
Taxa named by Henry Weed Fowler